BN Hydrographic & Oceanographic Center (BNHOC) is an agency for producing, procuring and distributing navigational charts and publications to BN ships and establishments as well as maintenance of hydrographic, oceanographic, cartographic, meteorological and data processing instrument/equipment. It is the core establishment of the Hydrographic Department and are located in New Mooring, Chattogram. Commodore A. K. M. M. Sherafullah is the Chief Hydrographer of Bangladesh Navy Hydrographic & Oceanographic Center.

History 
In 1983 BN Hydrographic Department was established as the Hydrographic School at BNS Issa Khan. After that in 1996, the Bangladesh Navy with support from the French government has modernized under the Hydro Bangla Project-1. After 5 years, Hydro Bangla Project-2 was completed and Bangladesh Navy Hydrographic & Oceanographic Center was established in 2001. BNHOC received prestigious membership of International Hydrographic Organization (IHO) in the year of 2001.

References 

National hydrographic offices
Bangladesh Navy
Shore establishments of the Bangladesh Navy
1983 establishments in Bangladesh